Ljubčo Georgievski or Lyubcho Georgievski (born 17 January 1966) is a politician from North Macedonia who served as the only Vice President of Macedonia and as the 3rd Prime Minister of the Republic of Macedonia, and is considered one of the pioneers of the country's independence. He founded the Internal Macedonian Revolutionary Organization - Democratic Party for Macedonian National Unity and was the first party president from 1990 to 2004. Nevertheless, following accusations of being pro-Bulgarian, Georgievski broke off with the party he founded and established the VMRO-NP, and later acquired Bulgarian citizenship.

Life
In his twenties he began to spread his pro-Macedonian independence, anti-Yugoslav and anti-communist politics among Macedonians. He first entered in the Movement for All-Macedonian Action and participated on the founding meeting of the party where he stated that MAAK has to be a movement for a confederation. In the circles of the party he met with Boris Zmejkovski and Dragan Bogdanovski. After he left the party he intended to create a new political movement.

Dragan Bogdanovski who was a proclaimed Macedonian rights movement activist had made a blueprint for a Democratic Party for Macedonian National Unity. He had also made a statute, book of rules, and an instruction of how the party is going to work. Georgievski together with Bogdanovski, Zmejkovski and few others activists had agreed to make a party for independent Macedonia. The Internal Macedonian Revolutionary Organization – Democratic Party for Macedonian National Unity was founded on 17 June 1990 and was the only political party in SR Macedonia that spoke for independence. On the first multi-party elections in 1990 Georgievski with his party had won the biggest number of seats in the Macedonian Assembly. Refusing to make a coalition with the ethnic Albanian parties Georgievski had failed to make government and a non-partisan government came to power. After a new constitution was adopted in November 1990 he was elected a Vice President  by the Assembly of the Republic of Macedonia.

Georgievski was active during the time when he was in opposition. In 1998 Georgievski won the parliamentary elections and became Prime Minister of Macedonia with a coalition government with the Democratic Alternative party and the Democratic Party of Albanians. He led the republic during the Macedonian insurgency in 2001 and later signed the Ohrid Agreement. During this period, he was accused by the opposition of implementing pro-Bulgarian policies. Georgievski resigned from his party in 2003 after he lost the 2002 elections. In recent years he is the president of the Internal Macedonian Revolutionary Organization - People's Party.

Georgievski is the founder of the right wing party VMRO-DPMNE. When the wars of Yugoslav succession started and the region was heading in for independence, Georgievski emerged as one of the strongest voices of opposition to challenge the Communist ruling structure, and succeeded in gaining strong public support. During his time in government (1998–2002), his coalition introduced strong reforms within the State administration, introduced the VAT system, started denationalisation, and adopted the pension system law. The Government managed to achieve very good financial results; foreign currency reserves were almost doubled, and a large budget surplus was also gained. In 2001, in Luxembourg, Georgievski signed the EU backed Stabilization and Association Agreement.

His political agenda was nevertheless questioned during the short conflict ignited by the ethnic Albanian guerrillas and Macedonian armed forces in 2001. The conflict ended with the signing of the Ohrid Framework Agreement, which pledged greater rights for the Albanian minority. Georgievski was accused of direct involvement in the conflict, to the point of having ignited it, for personal benefits. Shortly after he lost the elections in 2002 to the opposition party SDSM, accusations of corruption followed, thus considerably lowering his political profile.

He eventually broke off with the party he once founded, due to ideological incompatibility with his once Finance Minister Nikola Gruevski and founded VMRO-NP. Despite the members of the party not considering themselves Bulgarians, they strongly declare their Bulgarophilia and criticize the official statements about the Macedonian history issued by the politicians and historians in the country.

In North Macedonia, Georgievski has a reputation for being a Bulgarophile intellectual. In 2006 Georgievski applied for and was granted Bulgarian citizenship, declaring Bulgarian descent.

Literary work
In 1988 Georgievski graduated from the Ss. Cyril and Methodius University of Skopje, specializing in comparative literature. He is the author of two poetry books (Apocalypse and City) and one collection of short stories (Direct Interventions with Short Stories into the Anatomic Structure of History).
In late summer of 2007 Georgievski published his book "С лице към истината" ("Facing the truth") in Bulgaria. In it he reveals his attitude to Macedonian identity and Bulgarian past in the Republic of Macedonia.

In the Summer of 2012 Georgievski published his autobiographical book "It's me". There he reveals a range of new things of the unknown history of the country, including the fact that he together with his Serbian counterpart Zoran Đinđić, discussed the exchange of territories between Macedonia, Albania and Kosovo. The book confirms that in 1999 he was summoned to the White House, where former U.S. Secretary of State Madeleine Albright, sought permission from Macedonia ground forces of NATO to attack Serbia from the territory of the country. Among other things, he wrote that he had spent 15 minutes talking to former Serbian and Yugoslav President Slobodan Milošević while he was visiting former Macedonian Interior Minister Ljube Boškoski in the Scheveningen prison. Regarding the current state-political situation of the country, Georgievski concluded that today "the Macedonians are the biggest counterfeiters of the Balkan history". According to him the present development of the VMRO-DPMNE is his personal failure. Georgievski claims, today it is a fake party without any ideology.

Professional and political biography
 1990–2002 President of the VMRO-DPMNE
 1991 Vice President of Macedonia 
 1992–1995 Representative in the Assembly of the Republic of Macedonia
 1995–1998 Consulting in BS Consulting-Skopje
 1998–2002 Prime Minister of the Republic of Macedonia
 2002–2007 President of VMRO-NP
 2012– nowadays President of VMRO-NP

References

1966 births
Living people
People from Štip
Prime Ministers of North Macedonia
Macedonian people of Bulgarian descent
VMRO – People's Party politicians
VMRO-DPMNE politicians
Ss. Cyril and Methodius University of Skopje alumni